Leo Howard (born July 13, 1997) is an American actor and martial artist. Howard is known for incorporating his karate skills into his feature film and television roles; as "Young Snake-Eyes" in the 2009 action film G.I. Joe: The Rise of Cobra, as "Young Conan" in the 2011 fantasy film Conan the Barbarian, and as Jack on the Disney XD comedy series Kickin' It. Howard was certified as the youngest TV director ever by the Guinness World Records for his work on the episode "Fight at the Museum" in the fourth season of the Kickin' It TV series at age 16. He also played CeCe's rival Logan on Shake it Up in the third season.

Early life
Howard was born July 13, 1997, in Newport Beach, California. He is the son of Randye and Todd "The Big Bulldog" Howard. His parents are professional dog breeders and operate The Big Bulldog Ranch, where they specialize in breeding English and French bulldogs. His father is also an eviction specialist and process server starring in Spike TV's World's Worst Tenants. He attended Tri-City Christian Schools in Vista, California. Howard spent much of his childhood growing up in the small town of Fallbrook in Northern San Diego County, before devoting himself to a full-time acting career.

Career

Martial arts
Howard developed an interest in martial arts at age four and began studying when his parents enrolled him at a dojo in Oceanside, California. A year later, his parents enrolled him at another dojo which specialized in the Okinawan discipline of Shōrin-ryū and at the age of seven, he began developing his extreme martial arts skills by adding gymnastics to his routine. Howard began training under martial arts world champion Matt Mullins when Mullins made an exception allowing Howard to become the youngest student in his class. By the age of eight, Howard had won three world championships. His specialty is Shōrin-ryū, in which he holds two black belts.

At age nine, Howard became the youngest member to perform with Mullins' Sideswipe Performance Team, a traveling martial arts-based group that entertains audiences across the country with a combination of martial arts, dance and acrobatics. In June 2011, Howard spoke of the experience performing with Sideswipe: "I think that's what really got me addicted to performing. My role changed as I've grown as a performer and just plain grown. I was OK, I wasn't that great at the start, so they would do cool moves and then poof! There'd be this cute kid running out there to do some karate. But for the last couple of years I've been one of the main performers."

Acting
From a young age, Howard was a fan of Bruce Lee and Chuck Norris films, and admired their ability to incorporate martial arts into their acting. At the age of seven, Howard told his mother that he wanted to be an actor. It was at a martial arts tournament that Howard was first spotted by someone who thought he had the looks to go into show business and referred him to their talent agent. This led to work as a model for print advertorials and then as an actor in commercials. In 2010, Howard remembered his excitement about breaking into show business, saying, "The commercials were just insane to me. Getting a commercial was like getting a lead role in a movie to me."

In 2005, Howard made his television debut shortly before his eighth birthday with a small guest-starring role on the USA Network series, Monk dressed as a "little karate kid" for Halloween, his one line in the episode being "Maybe he's afraid of karate". Howard would spend the next several years performing with Sideswipe Performance Team before returning to acting in 2009.

In 2009, Howard landed his first steady job interviewing celebrities as "Leo Little", the host of the short-form Disney Channel talk show series, Leo Little's Big Show and made his feature film debut as "Eric Brooks" in the family film Aussie and Ted. In August of that year, Howard gained notoriety for his martial arts skills when he appeared as "Young Snake-Eyes", performing all of his own stunts in a flashback scene for the Paramount action-adventure film G.I. Joe: The Rise of Cobra. Later that same month, he appeared in a co-starring role as "Laser", one of the three "Short" brothers in the family comedy film Shorts, which earned the cast the Young Artist Award for that year as "Best Young Ensemble Cast". In November 2009, Howard began a recurring role as "Hart Hamlin" on the Disney XD series, Zeke and Luther. In 2010, Howard landed in his first leading role playing "Logan Hoffman" in the independent feature film, Logan.

In August 2010, Howard starred as "Young Conan", once again performing all of his own stunts in the sword and sorcery film, Conan the Barbarian. The film received mixed reviews, but Howard was praised for his performance, with film critic, Ty Burr of The Boston Globe writing, "The star (Jason Momoa) is arguably outshined by Leo Howard, the feral 13-year-old actor who plays the young Conan in the opening scenes." In an interview with Empire Magazine, director Marcus Nispel spoke of working with Howard: "After we finished the film, I went to Lionsgate and said 'Y'know, the movie to do next is Conan: The Early Years.' Leo absolutely blew me away. Almost the entire first act of Conan is the kid, which is unheard of. At the start, reading the script, everyone was like 'We have to cut that down to ten minutes'. And now everyone's like ‘Can we make that longer?!' He worked out like a charm. There aren't many young actors who could carry that sort of weight."

In June 2010, Howard landed a starring role as "Jack", a teenage karate expert who befriends a group of high school misfits on the Disney XD comedy series, Kickin' It. Howard recalled his reaction when he first got the script to audition for the show, saying, "I saw it was a martial arts show and I thought, 'Oh! I have to do this!'" With Howard receiving top billing and performing all of his own stunts, the series quickly became Disney XD's number 1 original series in the network's history, and would run for four seasons. Howard directed the Season 4 episode "Fight At The Museum."

In 2014, Howard played one of main roles in the film Andròn – The Black Labyrinth. In the film he played from Alec Baldwin and Danny Glover. He also guest starred on Lab Rats: Bionic Island. In March 2016, he directed an episode of Gamer's Guide to Pretty Much Everything.

In 2019, Howard landed a recurring role in Why Women Kill as "Tommy", an eighteen year-old butler who leads Simone, a woman dealing with a divorce after she realized her husband was gay, into having an affair with him. In 2019, he joined the second season of The CW television series Legacies in recurring capacity, before being promoted to a series regular role for the series' third season.

Music
In 2017, Howard and his Band - Ask Jonesy & Company, composed of Troy Romzek (lead vocals/guitar), Leo (lead guitar/vocals) and Ricky Ficarelli (bass/vocals), released their first single, Burning Fire. They are due out with their first album June 2018.

Personal life
Howard was home schooled to accommodate his busy work schedule on Kickin' It and spent most of his time living in the Howard family's home in Studio City, California when he worked, but still considered his childhood town of Fallbrook home. While still devoted to his passion for martial arts, Howard has stated that he has become more careful when it comes to "fighting" and "sparring" matches, due to the potential for injuries that could interfere with his obligations as an actor.

Howard's hobbies include cooking, playing guitar and collecting antique weapons, including swords and knives. The centerpiece of his collection being the big "Conan" sword that was presented to him after filming was completed on Conan the Barbarian. Howard has expressed a love for animals and has a pet sheepdog named "Murphy". He is also interested in veterinary medicine and volunteers at his local veterinary clinic in his free time.

Filmography

Film

Television

Music video
 "History" (2016), by Olivia Holt, as Love interest

Awards

References

External links 
 
 
 

1997 births
American male child actors
American male film actors
American male karateka
Shōrin-ryū practitioners
American male television actors
Living people
Male actors from Newport Beach, California
People from Vista, California
21st-century American male actors
People from Fallbrook, California
People from Studio City, Los Angeles